Regulator of G-protein signaling 13 (RGS13) is a protein that in humans is encoded by the RGS13 gene.

RGS13 is a member of R4 subfamily of the Regulator of G protein signaling (RGS) protein family, whose members have only short peptide sequences flanking the RGS domain. RGS13 suppresses the immunoglobulin E- mediated allergic responses.

RGS family members share similarity with S. cerevisiae SST2 and C. elegans egl-10 proteins, which contain a characteristic conserved RGS domain. RGS proteins accelerate GTPase activity of G protein alpha-subunits, thereby driving G protein into their inactive GDP-bound form, thus negatively regulating G protein signaling. RGS proteins have been implicated in the fine tuning of a variety of cellular events in response to G protein-coupled receptor activation. The biological function of this gene, however, is unknown. Two transcript variants encoding the same isoform exist.

References

Further reading